The 1985 Kent State Golden Flashes football team was an American football team that represented Kent State University in the Mid-American Conference (MAC) during the 1985 NCAA Division I-A football season. In their third season under head coach Dick Scesniak, the Golden Flashes compiled a 3–8 record (2–6 against MAC opponents), finished in ninth place in the MAC, and were outscored by all opponents by a combined total of 277 to 212.

The team's statistical leaders included Eric Wilkerson with 594 rushing yards, Steve Poth with 1,221 passing yards, and Jim Kilbane with 806 receiving yards.  Two Kent State players were selected as first-team All-MAC players: defensive lineman Lee Bullington and wide receiver Jim Kilbane.

Schedule

References

Kent State
Kent State Golden Flashes football seasons
Kent State Golden Flashes football